VA-153 was an Attack Squadron of the U.S. Navy. During a 1949 reorganization of the Naval Air Reserve, a Fighter Squadron at NAS New York (believed to have been VF-718) was redesignated Fighter Squadron VF-831. It was called to active duty on 1 February 1951. The squadron was redesignated as VF-153 on 4 February 1953, and finally as VA-153 on 15 December 1956. It was disestablished on 30 September 1977. The squadron's nickname was the Blue Tail Flies from 1953 onward.

Operational history

VF-831 was assigned to Carrier Air Group 15 (CVG-15), aboard , which was deployed to Korea from 8 September 1951 to 2 May 1952.
 February 1955: Squadron aircraft flew sorties in support of the evacuation of Chinese Nationalists from the Tachen Islands during the First Taiwan Straits Crisis.
 23 August–9 September 1958: The squadron flew sorties in the Taiwan Straits during the Second Taiwan Straits Crisis.
 January 1961: , with VA-153 embarked, operated in the South China Sea after Pathet Lao forces captured strategic positions in Laos.
 2 February 1965: The squadron began participating in operations in Laos. These operations involved Yankee Team, Operation Barrel Roll and Operation Steel Tiger missions.
 7 and 11 February 1965: The squadron participated in Flaming Dart I and II, reprisal strikes against targets in North Vietnam following a Viet Cong attack on the American advisors compound at Pleiku and the American billet in Qui Nhon, South Vietnam.
 March 1965: The squadron participated in Operation Rolling Thunder, the bombing of military targets in North Vietnam.
 13 August 1965: The squadron's commanding officer, Commander H. E. Thomas, was killed in action over North Vietnam.

 21 November 1970: The squadron flew missions in support of Operation Ivory Coast, an attempt to rescue American prisoners of war at the Son Tay prisoner compound, 20 miles west of Hanoi.
 11–22 February 1973: Following the ceasefire with North Vietnam the squadron flew combat missions in Laos until a ceasefire was signed with that country on 22 February 1973.
 February 1973: Commander D. R. Weichman, the squadron's executive officer, completed his 625th combat mission of the Vietnam War. He maintains the record for the highest number of combat missions for a Navy fixed-wing pilot during this conflict.
 November 1973: , with VA-153 embarked, departed from operations in the South China Sea to relieve  on station in the Arabian Sea due to the unsettled conditions following the Yom Kippur War.

Home port assignments
The squadron was assigned to these home ports, effective on the dates shown:
 NAS New York (Floyd Bennett Field) – assigned here prior to the squadron's recall to active duty on 1 February 1951.
 NAS Alameda – 01 Apr 1951
 NAS Moffett Field – 5 May 1952
 NAS Lemoore – 21 Aug 1961

Aircraft assignment
The squadron first received the following aircraft on the dates shown:
 F6F Hellcat *
 F9F-2 Panther – 06 Feb 1951
 F9F-5 Panther – Aug 1952
 F9F-6 Cougar – Oct 1953
 FJ-3 Fury – Mar 1955
 F9F-8 Cougar – Nov 1955
 F9F-8B Cougar – Apr 1956
 A4D-1 Skyhawk – 12 Feb 1957
 A4D-2 Skyhawk – 27 Oct 1958
 A4D-2N Skyhawk – 20 Jun 1961
 A-4E Skyhawk – Jan 1967
 A-4F Skyhawk – Apr 1968
 A-7A Corsair II – 14 Sep 1969
 A-7B Corsair II – May 1973
* While in a reserve status from September 1949 to January 1951, the
squadron was most likely utilizing F6F pool aircraft assigned to NAS
New York.

See also
 List of squadrons in the Dictionary of American Naval Aviation Squadrons
 Attack aircraft
 List of inactive United States Navy aircraft squadrons
 History of the United States Navy

References

External links

Attack squadrons of the United States Navy
Wikipedia articles incorporating text from the Dictionary of American Naval Aviation Squadrons